The 2021–22 Vijay Hazare Trophy was the twentieth season of the Vijay Hazare Trophy, a List A cricket tournament that was played in India. It was contested by 38 teams, divided into six groups, with six teams in Group A. The tournament was announced by the BCCI on 3 July 2021. Himachal Pradesh won Group A to progress to the quarter-finals, with Vidarbha finishing in second place to advance to the preliminary quarter-finals.

Points table

Fixtures
Source:

Round 1

Round 2

Round 3

Round 4

Round 5

References

Vijay Hazare Trophy
Vijay Hazare Trophy